The UEFA Euro 2016 qualifying Group E was one of nine groups drawn to decide which teams would qualify for the UEFA Euro 2016 finals tournament. Group E consisted of six teams: England, Switzerland, Slovenia, Estonia, Lithuania, and San Marino, who played against each other home-and-away in a round-robin format.

The top two teams, England and Switzerland, qualified directly for the finals. As third-placed Slovenia were not the highest-ranked among all third-placed teams, they advanced to the play-offs, where they lost to Ukraine and thus failed to qualify.

England won all ten of their matches becoming only the fifth national side to qualify for a European Championship with a 100% record, and the sixth instance, after France (1992 and 2004), Czech Republic (2000), Germany and Spain (both 2012).

Standings

Matches 

The fixtures were released by UEFA the same day as the draw, which was held on 23 February 2014 in Nice. Times are CET/CEST, as listed by UEFA (local times are in parentheses).

Goalscorers

Discipline 
A player was automatically suspended for the next match for the following offences:
 Receiving a red card (red card suspensions could be extended for serious offences)
 Receiving three yellow cards in three different matches, as well as after fifth and any subsequent yellow card (yellow card suspensions were carried forward to the play-offs, but not the finals or any other future international matches)
The following suspensions were served during the qualifying matches:

Notes

References

External links 
UEFA Euro 2016 qualifying round Group E

Group E
2014–15 in English football
qual
2014–15 in Slovenian football
2015–16 in Slovenian football
2014–15 in Swiss football
Q
2014 in Estonian football
2015 in Estonian football
2014 in Lithuanian football
2015 in Lithuanian football
2014–15 in San Marino football
2015–16 in San Marino football